Kaliphora madagascarensis is a species of evergreen shrub or small tree. It is  endemic to Madagascar, where it inhabits subhumid woodlands and forests in eastern Madagascar, in the provinces of Antananarivo, Antsiranana, Fianarantsoa, and Mahajanga.

Description
Kaliphora madagascariensis is a shrub or tree which grows 1 to 4 meters tall.

Range and habitat
Kaliphora madagascariensis is widespread in northern, central, and south-central Madagascar. It is chiefly found in the highlands of former Antsiranana, Mahajanga, Antananarivo and Fianaratsoa provinces. The species' estimated area of occupancy (AOO) is 420 km2, and estimated extent of occurrence (EOO) is 149,903 km2, based on known extant subpopulations.

Its principal habitats are dry, humid, and subhumid montane evergreen forests. It ranges from 50 to 2000 meters elevation.

Classification
Kaliphora madagascarensis is the sole species of the genus Kaliphora. Some recent classification systems, including the APG IV, classify the genus as part of family Montiniaceae; other systems, including that of Armen Takhtajan, classify Kaliphora in its own family, Kaliphoraceae.

References

External links
 Kaliphora madagascariensis in efloras.org

Endemic flora of Madagascar
Flora of the Madagascar subhumid forests
Monotypic Solanales genera
Solanales